Random graph theory of gelation is a mathematical theory for sol–gel processes. The theory is a collection of results that generalise the Flory–Stockmayer theory, and allow identification of the gel point, gel fraction, size distribution of polymers, molar mass distribution and other characteristics for a set of many polymerising monomers carrying arbitrary numbers and types of reactive functional groups. 

The theory builds upon the notion of the random graph, introduced by mathematicians Paul Erdős and Alfréd Rényi, and independently by Edgar Gilbert in late 1950's, as well as on the generalisation of this concept known as the random graph with a fixed degree sequence. The theory has been originally developed to explain step-growth polymerisation, and adaptations to other types of polymerisation now exist. Along with providing theoretical results the theory is also constructive. It indicates that the graph-like structures resulting from polymerisation can be sampled with an algorithm using the configuration model, which makes these structures available for further examination with computer experiments.

Premises and degree distribution 
At a given point of time, degree distribution , is the probability that a randomly chosen monomer has  connected neighbours. The central idea of the random graph theory of gelation is that a cross-linked or branched polymer can be studied separately at two levels: 1) monomer reaction kinetics that predicts  and 2) random graph with a given degree distribution. The advantage of such a decoupling is that the approach allows one to study the monomer kinetics with relatively simple rate equations, and then deduce the degree distribution serving as input for a random graph model. In several cases the aforementioned rate equations have a known analytical solution.

One type of functional groups 
In the later expression unit reaction rate is assumed without loss of generality. Analytical expression for average molecular weight and molar mass distribution are known too. When more complex reaction kinetics are involved, for example chemical substitution, side reactions or degradation, one may still apply the theory by computing  using numerical integration. In which case,  signifies that the system is in the gel state at time t (or in the sol state when the inequality sign is flipped).

Two types of functional groups 
When monomers with two types of functional groups A and B undergo step growth polymerisation by virtue of a reaction between A and B groups, a similar analytical results are known. See the table on the right for several examples. In this case,  is the fraction of initial monomers with  groups A and  groups B. Suppose that A is the group that is depleted first. Molecular size distribution, the molecular weight averages, and the distribution of gyration radii have known formal analytical expressions.

Generalisations 
Known generalisations include monomers with an arbitrary number of functional group types, crosslinking polymerisation, and complex reaction networks.

References 

Polymerization reactions
Polymer chemistry
Graph theory